Bon Boullogne (bapt. February 22, 1649 – May 17, 1717) was a French painter.

Biography

Boullogne was born in Paris, a son of the painter Louis Boullogne; he was regarded as the most gifted of his children. He took his first lessons from his father, whom he is thought to have assisted in the Grande Galerie of the Louvre. Through his father, who presented a half-length figure of St John by Bon to Jean-Baptiste Colbert, Contrôleur Général des Finances, he was sent to the Académie de France in Rome as a Pensionnaire du Roi. In this capacity, he made copies of famous works, in particular some frescoes by Raphael in the Vatican Loggie, intended for reproduction as Gobelins tapestries. The period he then spent in Lombardy helped to complete his training. He studied the work of Antonio da Correggio and the Annibale Carracci, as well as Guido Reni, Domenichino and Francesco Albani. Bon’s painting, especially the mythological work, shows great affinities with the work of the Bolognese school, which was also to be found in the royal collections. Also of influence to Bon was Nordic art, as demonstrated in his female portraits framed by plant like motifs, a device taken up by his pupil Robert Tournières.  He died in Paris.

Paintings
 Tobias fighting his father (c 1705), Palais des Beaux-Arts de Lille
 Jephtha's Daughter, Saint Petersburg, Hermitage Museum
 Saint Nicolas ressucitant les enfants,  Montauban, Le Musée Ingres
 Emigration des Tectosages, Toulouse, Musée des Augustins
 Zéphyr et Flore, Musée des Beaux-Arts de Rouen
 Le Lavement de pieds, Dijon; Musée des beaux-arts
 Le Triomphe d'Amphitrite, Dijon, Musée Magnin
 L'enlèvement de Proserpine, Lisieux, Musée d'art et d'histoire de Lisieux
 Pan et Syrinx, Lisieux, Musée d'art et d'histoire de Lisieux
 Deux anges portant des instruments de musique, Versailles, Musée national du château et des Trianons
 Junon et Flore, Versailles, Musée national du château et des Trianons
 Hercule combat les centaures, Paris, Louvre
 La mort de Saint Ambroise,  Paris, Louvre

Students
Nicolas Bertin
Pierre-Jacques Cazes
 Joseph Christophe
François Hutin
Sébastien Leclerc
Charles Parrocel
Jean Raoux
Jean-Baptiste Santerre
Louis de Silvestre
Robert Tournières

References

Further reading
 
 
 
 
 
 
 
 

17th-century French painters
French male painters
18th-century French painters
1649 births
1717 deaths
Painters from Paris
18th-century French male artists